Negoslavci is a village and a municipality in Vukovar-Syrmia County in eastern Croatia. It is located south of the town of Vukovar, seat of the county. Landscape of the Negoslavci Municipality is marked by the Pannonian Basin plains and agricultural fields of maize, wheat, common sunflower and sugar beet.

The modern day municipality was established in 1997 by the UNTAES administration as one of new predominantly Serb municipalities in order to ensure access to local self-government to Serb community in the region.

Name
The name of the village in Croatian or Serbian is plural.

Geography
It is connected by D57 highway with the rest of the country.

History
Negoslavci village is mentioned in historical documents from the 15th century. The village was most probably established during the Ottoman rule in Hungary as it was not identified in earlier medieval documents. During the Ottoman period village was named Nigoslavci and its extensive land properties were reaching all up to the village of Sotin. After the Ottoman retreat from Syrmia Roman Catholic ethnic Croats also left Negoslavci under unexplained conditions. Subsequently, Eastern Orthodox settlers colonized the village and in 1736 there was 51 households all of which were Eastern Orthodox. The 19th century was a period of demographic growth with village reaching 170 households and 890 inhabitants in 1866. 866 of them were Eastern Orthodox while other included Roman Catholic Croats and Germans. During Austro-Hungarian administration, settlement of Negoslavci was the seat of the municipality, as was evidenced by the records from 1894. During the World War II in Yugoslavia and the Genocide of Serbs in the Independent State of Croatia administrator of the village was Johann Pfeiffer, member of the local German community from Vukovar. As he was actively involved in efforts to save local Serbs from Wehrmacht  and Ustashe prisons his family was exempt from obligatory post World War II expulsion of Germans from Yugoslavia. After World War II, the village was settled by the people from Bosnia and Herzegovina.

Demographics

Population
Negoslavci has 1,417 inhabitants, the majority of whom are Serbs, making up 96.86 percent of the population according to the 2011 population census. This makes Negoslavci the municipality with the second-highest percentage of Serbs in Croatia. It is also the municipality with the lowest percentage of Croats (1.78%) in the country.

Languages

Due to the local minority population, the Negoslavci municipality prescribe the use of not only Croatian as the official language, but the Serbian language and Serbian Cyrillic alphabet as well.

Religion
The majority of the population belongs to the Serbian Orthodox Church.

Politics

Joint Council of Municipalities
The Municipality of Negoslavci is one of seven Serb majority member municipalities within the Joint Council of Municipalities, inter-municipal sui generis organization of ethnic Serb community in eastern Croatia established on the basis of Erdut Agreement. As Serb community constitute majority of the population of the municipality it is represented by 2 delegated Councillors at the Assembly of the Joint Council of Municipalities, double the number of Councilors to the number from Serb minority municipalities in Eastern Croatia.

Municipality government
The municipality assembly is composed of 11 representatives.  Assembly members come from electoral lists winning  more than 5% of votes. Dominant party in Negoslavci since the reintegration of eastern Slavonia in 1998 is Independent Democratic Serb Party. 323 or 30,62 % out of 1,055 voters participated in 2017 Croatian local elections with 94,72 % valid votes. With 96,28% and 311 votes Dušan Jeckov from Independent Democratic Serb Party was elected as municipality major. As of 2017, the member parties/lists are:

|- style="background-color:#E9E9E9" align=center
!colspan=2|Party
!Votes
!%
!Seats
|-
| bgcolor=#C50200|
|align=left valign=top|Independent Democratic Serb Party||305||100,00||11 
|-
|align=left colspan=2|Invalid/blank votes||17||5,28||—
|-
|align=left colspan=2|Total||322 ballots  and 323 voters||100||—
|-
|align=left colspan=2|Registered voters/turnout||1.055||30,52 %/30,62 %||—
|-
|align=left colspan=8|

|-
|align=left colspan=8|Source: page 59-60 
|}

Economy
Negoslavci is underdeveloped municipality which is statistically classified as the First Category Area of Special State Concern by the Government of Croatia. According to municipal mayor unemployment is one of the biggest problems of Negoslavci.

Education
The Elementary School in Negoslavci was established in 1761. The new school building was constructed in 1981. Since 1992 school operates as an eight grade school, and due to increased number of students come to upgrade two classrooms with USAID funds. Each year the school celebrates traditional feast slava dedicated to Saint Sava. In  2011, during celebration of 250 anniversary, school issued Chronicle of elementary school in Negoslavci which was jointly funded by Vukovar-Srijem County, Joint Council of Municipalities, Negoslavci municipality, Prosvjeta, Serb National Council and other donors.

Culture

Points of Interest
Church of the Dormition of the Theotokos is a Serbian Orthodox church completed in 1757. There are two ossuaries from the period of World War II with the bones of Yugoslav Partisan fighters from the time of Syrmian Front. First of the ossuaries state in Serbian Cyrillic script "In the glorious name of 40 fighters of the 1st Proletarian and 8th Montenegrin Brigade, the 1st Proletarian Division, who fell in 1944-1945 on the Syrmian Front for the freedom and the better future of their people." On the second one with the unknown number of fighters there is Cyrillic inscription "You who have shed your blood, you who have given your young lives, You who have fall for the sake of freedom, We honor you with the greatest glory and thankfulness. Negoslavci Women's Section."

In popular culture
Negoslavci attracted media attention in Croatia and abroad after its consistent elections patterns, which were different from the predominantly conservative ones in Slavonia. In 2016 Al Jazeera Balkans commentator Borna Sor jokingly compared 'liberal' Negoslavci with the mythological country of Arcadia after conservative Croatian Democratic Union failed to receive a single vote in the municipality (their worst result in the country) despite good results in the rest of the region. At the time of 2013 Croatian constitutional referendum, which created a constitutional prohibition against same-sex marriage, 75% of voters in Negoslavci rejected the proposal, which was the highest percentage of opposition in Croatia. Negoslavci had the lowest turnout at the referendum, with only 3% of voters taking part.

Associations and institutions
Volunteer fire department is active in the village of Negoslavci.

Sport
The football team PZ Negoslavci is situated in this village. Football is the main sport played and possibly the only organized sport in the municipality.

Twin municipalities – Sister municipalities

Other forms of cooperation
  Borovo, Croatia
  Temerin, Serbia
  Titel, Serbia
  Žabalj, Serbia

See also
 Joint Council of Municipalities
 Church of the Dormition of the Theotokos, Negoslavci

References

Municipalities of Croatia
Populated places in Syrmia
Populated places in Vukovar-Syrmia County
Joint Council of Municipalities
Serb communities in Croatia